Andrei Gorban (born July 19, 1983) is a professional tennis player from Moldova. He is a permanent member of the Moldova Davis Cup team.

Davis Cup

Singles performances (20–12)

Doubles performances (7–11)

References

External links
 
 
 

Living people
1983 births
Moldovan male tennis players
21st-century Moldovan people